Professor John MacFarlane Cliff FRCP (28 October 1921–3 July 1972) was a senior British physician, and Professor of Naval Medicine at Royal Hospital Haslar.

Biography

Born on 28 October 1921, John MacFarlane Cliff was educated at Bedford School, at Christ's College, Cambridge, and at St Thomas's Hospital Medical School. He was house surgeon at Addenbrooke's Hospital before gaining a commission in the Royal Navy Medical Service in 1946. He was elected as a Fellow of the Royal College of Physicians in 1966 and appointed as Professor of Naval Medicine at Royal Hospital Haslar in 1971. He published widely on reactive arthritis, asthma, mediastinal emphysema, and iatrogenesis.

Professor John MacFarlane Cliff died in Haslar, Hampshire on 3 July 1972.

References

1921 births
1972 deaths
People educated at Bedford School
Alumni of Christ's College, Cambridge
Alumni of St Thomas's Hospital Medical School
Fellows of the Royal College of Physicians
20th-century English medical doctors